Whomp That Sucker is the tenth album by the American rock band Sparks, released in 1981.

History
Sparks had recorded No. 1 In Heaven and Terminal Jive with Giorgio Moroder. Both had been relatively successful, but the brothers had found the electronic equipment they had adopted for their new sound too cumbersome to tour with. Whomp That Sucker was consequently recorded without Giorgio Moroder at Musicland Studios, Munich but still in association with Giorgio Moroder Enterprises.  The next four albums were recorded as part of the same partnership. The producer for the album was Mack, who had recently produced Queen's album The Game.

The album marked Sparks' return proper to a rock sound after their previous two disco efforts. To complement the Mael Brothers the backing band Bates Motel was hired, consisting of guitarist Bob Haag, bassist Leslie Bohem, and drummer David Kendrick. Together this line-up would record the next four Sparks albums concluding with Music That You Can Dance To in 1986. Haag, Bohem and Kendrick also recorded on their own under the name Gleaming Spires. The group recorded three studio albums in the early eighties and had a minor novelty new wave hit, "Are You Ready for the Sex Girls?", in 1981. Bohem later became a Hollywood screenwriter.

Release
Whomp That Sucker was released by a number of different record labels; RCA in the US, Underdog in France, Ariola/Oasis in Germany and in the UK by the short-lived Why-Fi Records. The album was not a success in the UK but did fairly well in France coming as it did off the back of their 1980 French hit "When I'm with You". In the US the album reached #182 on the Billboard 200, becoming their first since Indiscreet to chart there.

"Tips for Teens" and "Funny Face" were released as singles. In France "Funny Face" was the lead single, while in the UK "Tips for Teens" was. "Don't Shoot Me" was selected as the B-side for "Tips for Teens" in the UK.

Track listing

Personnel
 Russell Mael - vocals
 Ron Mael - keyboards and synthesizers (Yamaha CS80, Polymoog, Roland JP4, Yamaha Grand, Wurlitzer Electric), cover concept
 Leslie Bohem - bass guitar and additional background vocals
 Bob Haag - guitar and additional background vocals
 David Kendrick - drums
 Mack - synthesizer programming, glass shattering, production, engineering

References 

Sparks (band) albums
1981 albums
Albums produced by Reinhold Mack
RCA Records albums
Carrere Records albums
Oglio Records albums
Repertoire Records albums